José Orlando Vinha Rocha Semedo (born 5 March 1965) is a Portuguese retired footballer who played as a central midfielder.

He amassed Primeira Liga totals of 248 games and 28 goals over the course of 15 seasons, representing in the competition Porto and Salgueiros.

Club career
Born in Ovar, Semedo started playing professionally for FC Porto. Although he was already part of the first-team setup during their conquest of the European Cup, he was only a fringe player (only 27 Primeira Liga appearances in four seasons combined), beginning to appear regularly precisely the following campaign as the club added the Intercontinental Cup and the UEFA Super Cup; domestically, 1987–88 ended with the double.

In 1994, Semedo, who was a relatively important unit in 12 of Porto's 22 accolades during his spell, suffered a severe knee injury from which he never recovered. At 31, he moved to neighbours S.C. Salgueiros, retiring from football after three years where he was sparingly used.

Semedo started coaching in 2009, being an assistant in Padroense FC's under-17. Two years later, in the same predicament, he returned to Porto's seniors, joining newly appointed Vítor Pereira's staff.

International career
Over five years, Semedo earned 21 caps for Portugal and scored two goals. One of those came on 31 March 1993 in a 1–1 draw in Switzerland for the 1994 FIFA World Cup qualifiers, as the national side finished third in its group, being eliminated from the final stages precisely by those opponents.

|}

Honours
Porto
Primeira Liga: 1984–85, 1985–86, 1987–88, 1989–90, 1991–92, 1992–93, 1994–95, 1995–96
Taça de Portugal: 1983–84, 1987–88, 1990–91, 1993–94
Supertaça Cândido de Oliveira: 1983, 1984, 1986, 1990, 1991, 1993, 1994
European Cup: 1986–87
Intercontinental Cup: 1987
UEFA Super Cup: 1987

References

External links

1965 births
Living people
People from Ovar
Portuguese footballers
Association football midfielders
Primeira Liga players
FC Porto players
S.C. Salgueiros players
Portugal youth international footballers
Portugal under-21 international footballers
Portugal international footballers
Sportspeople from Aveiro District